Tun Datuk Seri Panglima Haji Juhar bin Mahiruddin (born 5 November 1953) is a Malaysian politician who has served as the 10th Yang di-Pertua Negeri of Sabah since January 2011. He served as Speaker of the Sabah State Legislative Assembly from December 2002 to December 2010, Deputy Speaker of the Dewan Rakyat and Member of Parliament (MP) for Kinabatangan from October 1990 to November 1999. He is also the longest-serving Yang di-Pertua Negeri of Sabah, Chancellor of the Universiti Malaysia Sabah (UMS) and founding member of the United Malays National Organisation (UMNO) of Sabah.

Biography 
Juhar was born on Tambisan Island, off the coast of the Sandakan Division in Sabah in 1953 to a political family. His father, Mahiruddin Husin was a member of the United Sabah National Organisation (USNO).

He received his Bachelor of Laws degree from Wolverhampton Polytechnic in 1977 and was called to the Bar at Lincoln's Inn in 1980. He served as a first-class magistrate from 1981 to 1982 and went into private practice from 1982 to 1985.

Political career 
Juhar joined USNO, a Barisan Nasional (BN) component party of the time, and campaigned unsuccessfully for office twice, before being elected to Dewan Rakyat for Kinabatangan in October 1990. He was also appointed as the Deputy Speaker upon taking his seat in parliament, and served throughout his term as member of parliament.

USNO had been experiencing a decline since 1976, when it lost the state government to the Sabah People's United Front (BERJAYA), which later joined BN. It was disbanded in 1991, and Juhar was involved in negotiations that culminated in the entry of UMNO into Sabah, and the absorption of USNO members into UMNO.

He was not selected to contest the 1999 general election, but remained active in politics. In December 2002, he was appointed as the Speaker of the Sabah State Legislative Assembly. He carried on to serve till December 2010, when he was to be appointed the 10th Yang di-Pertua Negeri of Sabah by King Mizan Zainal Abidin. He was sworn in on 1 January 2011.

He was sworn in once again for his second term on the first day in 2015.

In 2018, he was again reappointed as the Yang di-Pertua Negeri for the third term.

On 23 December 2022, he was confirmed to be reappointed as the Governor of Sabah for his fourth term from 1 January 2023 to 31 December 2024 for 2 years.On 1 January 2023, he was officially sworn in.

Election results

Personal life 
Juhar is married to Norlidah R. M. Jasni and has four children.

Honours

Honours of Malaysia
  :
  Commander of the Order of Meritorious Service (PJN) – Datuk (1997)
  Grand Commander of the Order of the Defender of the Realm (SMN) – Tun (2011)
  :
 Grand Knight of the Order of the Territorial Crown (SUMW) – Datuk Seri Utama (2021)
  :
  Knight Grand Commander of the Order of the Defender of State (DUPN) – Dato' Seri Utama (2022)
 :
  Companion of the Order of Kinabalu (ASDK)
  Commander of the Order of Kinabalu (PGDK) – Datuk (1996)
 Grand Commander of the Order of Kinabalu (SPDK) – Datuk Seri Panglima

References 

Living people
1953 births
Kadazan-Dusun people
Suluk people
Malaysian Muslims
People from Sabah
Yang di-Pertua Negeri of Sabah
United Malays National Organisation politicians
Alumni of the University of Wolverhampton
Members of Lincoln's Inn
20th-century Malaysian judges
Members of the Dewan Rakyat
Speakers of the Sabah State Legislative Assembly

Grand Commanders of the Order of the Defender of the Realm
Commanders of the Order of Kinabalu